At least two ships of the French Navy have been named Jean de Vienne:

 , a  launched in 1935 and scuttled in 1942
 , a  launched in 1981

French Navy ship names